Torsa River (also spelt Torsha and also known as Kambu Maqu, Machu and Amo Chhu) rises from the Chumbi Valley in Tibet, China, where it is known as Machu. Its course continues into Bhutan, India, and Bangladesh before joining Brahmaputra River into the Bay of Bengal.

Course 
From Tibet, Torsa flows into Bhutan, where it is known as the Amo Chu. After entering West Bengal in India, it is known as Torsa. In Bangladesh too, it is known by the same name. It is also known as: Chumbi, Am-Chu, Jaldhaka.

Afterwards, the river flows past the border towns of Phuntsholing (in Bhutan) and Jaigaon, and Hasimara (in India) and past the tea estate of Dalsingpara and the Jaldapara National Park. Ghargharia river meets with Torsa in the Tufanganj subdivision, near Deocharai and Balarampur. Torsa meets with Kaljani and then flows into Bangladesh by the name of Kaljani and meets with Brahmaputra in BD. A distributary known as Buri Torsa meets Jaldhaka.

Ghargharia river meets with Torsa in the Tufanganj subdivision, near Deocharai and Balarampur Torsa meets with Kaljani and it then flows into Bangladesh by the name of Kaljani and meets with the Jamuna there.

Major towns
Major towns on its banks are:
 Phuntsholing, in Bhutan
 Cooch Behar, in India
 Torsa Strict Nature Reserve, upstream in Bhutan

Hydro projects
 Amo chu Hydro Power Project, By NTPC Limited

Floods
River Torsha along with River Jaldhaka, and River Teesta have created major flooding multiple times in Bangladesh during monsoon season between June to September.

References

Further reading 

 

Rivers of Bhutan
Rivers of West Bengal
Rivers of Tibet
Rivers of Bangladesh
International rivers of Asia
Rivers of India
Tributaries of the Brahmaputra River